Jay Foreman (born 4 October 1984) is an English YouTuber, singer-songwriter, and comedian.

Early life and education
Foreman was born on 4 October 1984. He was raised in a Jewish household in Stanmore, London, with his brother and sister. His brother Darren is beatboxer and musician Beardyman.

From 1996 to 2003, Foreman was educated at Queen Elizabeth's School, a state grammar school for boys in Barnet, north London, followed by the University of York, where he began performing comedy songs on acoustic guitar in 2005.

Career

Foreman was featured as the BBC New Talent Pick of the Fringe 2007, won Best Newcomer at the Tuborg Musical Comedy awards 2009, and came third at the Musical Comedy Awards 2010.

In 2009, Foreman contributed jingles to the weekly comedy podcast Answer Me This!, and in 2011 and 2012, supported comedian Dave Gorman on Dave Gorman's PowerPoint Presentation tour.

Foreman presented The General Election Xplained, a film sent to every secondary school in the UK in 2010, which won gold at the New York Festival for Best PR Film.

For several years, he has also performed shows at the Edinburgh Festival Fringe, which include Disgusting Songs For Revolting Children (And Other Funny Stories), and No More Colours and Mixtape.

Jay Foreman's songs have been heard on BBC Radio 4, Radio 4 Extra, The One Show, and London Live TV.

YouTube
Foreman created his YouTube channel in April 2006, originally under the username "jayforeman51". It contains various clips from his comedy shows, tongue-in-cheek educational series such as Map Men (presented with Mark Cooper-Jones), Politics Unboringed, Unfinished London, and music videos for his songs; at times some of his original comedy is integrated into his in-video sponsor advertisements. As of 4 October 2022, Foreman has over 1.32 million subscribers and has amassed nearly 166 million views across all his public videos.

Map Men
Map Men is a series of educational YouTube videos co-presented with Mark Cooper-Jones. The series premiered in 2016. It consists of five to ten minute long videos about specific maps and abnormalities contained in them.

Politics Unboringed
Politics Unboringed was a series of educational YouTube videos with the first episode uploaded in 2015 and the last in 2017. Each episode is roughly five minutes long and handles various topics relating to British politics. In 2021, Foreman indicated in his Stereo podcasts that he intends to not continue the series as he claims that politics does not need to be "unboringed" anymore.

Unfinished London
Unfinished London is a series of educational YouTube videos with the first episode uploaded in 2009. Each Unfinished London episode is roughly ten minutes long and handles a specific area of the evolution of London's infrastructure, urban planning, and local government. Foreman describes it on its YouTube description page as "A show about London's quirky, unexplained unbuilt infrastructure, exploring bridges over nothing, tunnels to nowhere, and borders that don't make any sense".

Personal life
In June 2019, Foreman and his partner, Jade Nagi, announced their engagement via Twitter. The couple married in 2021. The two have a son born in July 2022.

Foreman supported Green Party candidate Siân Berry during the 2016 London mayoral election, and created a political ad voicing his support for her proposed policy to close London City Airport and convert it into a new residential neighborhood.

Foreman is ethnically Jewish, and in a statement written for the London Jewish News in 2018, he described his fondness for his family's Jewish traditions, even though Foreman himself is an atheist.

Awards and nominations

References

External links
 

1984 births
21st-century English comedians
21st-century English singers
21st-century male singers
Alumni of the University of York
Comedians from London
Educational and science YouTubers
English atheists
English Jews
English male comedians
English male singers
English YouTubers
Jewish atheists
Living people
Music YouTubers
Musicians from London
People from Stanmore
Comedy YouTubers
YouTubers from London